The Pa-Auk Forest Monastery, known in Burmese as the Pa-Auk Tawya, is a Theravāda monastery in the village of Pa-Auk in Mawlamyine, Mon State. Situated in a tropical forest along the Dawna Range, it is the main monastery complex and meditation centre of the Pa-Auk Society. The Most Ven. Bhaddanta Āciṇṇa has been its abbot since 1981, succeeding the Ven. Phelhtaw Sayadaw Aggapañña at the latter's request.

The monastery provides an ideal setting for the long-term practice of meditation. The number of residents varies seasonally from approximately 1,500 to 2,500 during festive periods. This includes more than 300 foreign monks, nuns and lay practitioners, originating from over 20 countries. The Pa-Auk Society comprises over 40 branches and associate centres in Myanmar and internationally.

References

External links
 Official website

Pa-Auk Society
Dawna Range
Burmese Theravada Buddhist temples and monasteries
Buildings and structures in Mon State